Ralph Lane (16 March 1930 – 29 May 2014) was an Australian rules footballer who played in the Victorian Football League (VFL).

Ralph Lane joined Melbourne in 1951 and played two Grand Finals in 1954 and 1956. He retired in 1956 to commit to his business career, though he continued playing with McKinnon in the Federal Football League, winning three premierships from 1957–59.

Lane was made a life member of the Melbourne Football Club and the VFL in 1989.

References

External links

Melbourne Football Club players
Australian rules footballers from Victoria (Australia)
Frankston Bombers players
1930 births
2014 deaths
Melbourne Football Club Premiership players
One-time VFL/AFL Premiership players